Polychrus peruvianus, the Peruvian bush anole, is a species of bush anole native to Peru and Ecuador. It was initially placed in the genus, Polychroides,  before being corrected in 1965.

Description 
Polychrus peruvianus have a maximum length of 152 millimeters. Males are larger than females. A dorsal or gular crest is present on individuals.

References 

Polychrotidae
Lizards of South America
Reptiles of Ecuador
Reptiles of Peru
Reptiles described in 1924
Taxa named by Gladwyn Kingsley Noble